Anna Bilińska (pronounced:  also known as Anna Bilińska-Bohdanowicz; 8 December 1854 – 18 April 1893) was a Polish painter, known for her portraits. A representative of realism, she spent most of her life in Paris, and is considered the "first internationally known Polish woman artist."

Life

Early years 
She was born 1854 in Zlatopol (formerly a frontier town of the Russian Empire, today a part of Novomyrhorod, Ukraine) as Anna Bilińska, and spent her childhood there with her father, a Polish physician. Of her background, she joked that she "ha[d] a Cossack's temperament, but a Polish heart". The family then moved to Central Russia, where Anna’s first art teachers were Ignacy Jasiński and Michał Elwiro Andriolli, both deported by the Tsarist government to Vyatka for their part in the January Uprising of 1863–1864. 

In 1875, Bilińska's mother moved the family to Warsaw, enrolling her of-age children in the conservatoire. Anna was a talented pianist, an activity considered a suitable achievement for a woman of her class and time. But painting, a more suspect pursuit, would become her preference.

In 1877, she became a student of the painter Wojciech Gerson and began to exhibit her work at Warsaw's Zachęta Society for the Promotion of Fine Arts. Against her parents' wishes, she hired her own studio at 2 Nowy Świat Street, selling her paintings and paying the studio's rent from her own funds.

Europe: travels to Austria, Italy & Paris 
In early 1882, she accompanied her chronically ill friend Klementyna Krassowska on a journey to Munich, Salzburg, Vienna and northern Italy, before traveling to and settling in Paris, where she studied along with Marie Bashkirtseff and English artist Emmeline Deane at the Académie Julian, and where later she also taught. In 1884, her father, Jan Biliński, and Krassowska died, leaving her emotionally devastated. However, her future was financially secured in Krassowska's last will and she was taken care of by fellow painter Maria Gażycz who lived in Normandy. 

In 1889, she presented her Self-Portrait at the Exposition Universelle in Paris for which she was awarded a silver medal and was granted the right to exhibit her works out of competition during future editions of the event. This proved to be her first major international success. In 1889, her works were exhibited at the Royal Academy of Art in London. In 1891, they were displayed at an annual international exhibition in Berlin where she was awarded a gold medal.

She lived in France until 1892, when she married Antoni Bohdanowicz, a doctor of medicine, and took his name. After their marriage, they returned to Warsaw, where she intended to open a Parisian-style art school for women, but fell ill with a heart condition and died a year later on 18 April 1893. She was interred at Warsaw's Powązki Cemetery.

Works

Anna Bilińska is best known for her portraits, especially those featuring women, painted with great intuition. Her Self-Portrait with Apron and Brushes (1887) developed a new self-portrait pose by placing the artist in front of a model's backdrop, thus stating that she is her own model. Her portrait titled By the Window (1890), painted using the pastel technique, was regarded by 19th-century critics as Bilińska's most modern painting considering its subject matter, framing, and the use of light. It depicts a young girl leaning out of a window towards a sunlit garden and was probably painted during the artist's summer holiday spent in the fishing village of Boyardville.  Among her notable male portraits is the portrait of American sculptor George Grey Barnard painted in 1890 at the request of Alfred Corning Clark. She also painted still lifes, genre scenes and landscapes using oil watercolors and sometimes pastels. 

Two of Bilińska's paintings went missing after World War II: A Negress (1884) and The Italian Woman (1880). The former was rediscovered at an auction in Germany in 2011 and successfully reclaimed in 2012 thanks to the efforts of the Ministry of Culture and National Heritage of Poland. It is currently displayed at the National Museum in Warsaw.

Her paintings can be found in the National Museum in Warsaw, National Museum in Wrocław, National Museum in Kraków, Victoria Art Gallery in Bath, Musée d'art moderne in Saint-Étienne, Lviv National Art Gallery, Gothenburg Museum of Art, State Museum of Pennsylvania, Berlin Musical Instrument Museum as well as private collections.

Legacy

Bilińska is considered the first female Polish artist to receive a professional artistic education at an academic level and to earn critical acclaim abroad. She was included in the 2018 American Federation of Arts' exhibition Women Artists in Paris, 1850–1900.

Shortly after Bilińska's father died in 1882, Bilińska's portrait, depicting the artist in deep mourning, was painted by her friend, Emmeline Deane, in Paris. This painting (now in the Victoria Art Gallery) evoked such emotional intensity of loss that, when exhibited in Paris and London, it "caused such a stir that it featured in a cartoon in Punch magazine." The work is considered to be significant because it was not common, at that time, for women painters to create formal salon-style portraits of other women painters, let alone to exhibit them.

Bilińska's work was not well known through the 20th century, even in her home country. Some credit the "prejudices of the time and her own early death and short career" for this lack of recognition, but, if so, it was a fate she held in common with numerous other gifted women painters of the 19th century. In 2017, thirty-seven of these "forgotten female artists" were featured in the traveling exhibition, Women Artists in Paris, 1850–1900. The show was perhaps more notable for codifying the works of the numerous 19th century women artists who had not, in fact, been forgotten, and whose paintings had begun to be, increasingly, appreciated. Indeed, the show was criticized for failing to fully explore why these artists "continue to be underestimated."

In 2021 the National Museum in Warsaw held a major retrospective of Bilińska work, displaying over 120 paintings (including Deane's 1886 portrait). The exhibition's biographical notes provided a timely assessment of her work, proclaiming that Bilińska's paintings had become "part of the canon of Polish art," while simultaneously reflecting that the scholarship on her "entire œuvre and life story" remained, as yet, incomplete.  The exhibition reviewers' consensus appeared to be that the show was finally bringing Bilińska the "recognition she deserves," and at the same time advancing further questions about her art and life.

Exhibitions

Posthumous 

 Artystka, Anna Bilińska 1854–1893; (26 Jun – 10 Oct 2021) National Museum in Warsaw, Poland. Solo retrospective.
 Women Artists in Paris, 1850–1900; (22 Oct 2017 – 15 Jan 2018) Denver Art Museum, Colorado (17 Feb – 13 May 2018); Speed Art Museum in Louisville, Kentucky; and (9 Jun – 3 Sep 2018) at the Clark Art Institute, Williamstown, MA.

Gallery

Selected paintings

See also
 List of Poles

Bibliography 
 Clara Erskine Clement, Women in the Fine Arts from the Seventh Century B.C. to The Twentieth Century A.D., 1904
 Magdalena Schlender, Die Selbstbildnisse der polnischen Malerin Anna Bilińska (The self-portraits of the Polish painter Anna Bilińska), Hamburg 2005
 Magdalena Schlender, Anna Bilińska Bohdanowicz, probably 2009.

References

External links
 Anna Bilińska-Bohdanowicz at culture.pl
 Top 10 Treasures of Victoria Art Gallery: EMMELINE DEANE: ANNA BILINSKA   / Series
 Short, exhibition related video: Artystka, Anna Bilińska 1854–1893 (with Polish titles) 
 

1857 births
1893 deaths
People from Novomyrhorod
People from Chigirinsky Uyezd
Clan of Sas
People from the Russian Empire of Polish descent
19th-century Polish painters
19th-century Polish women artists
Polish women painters
Académie Julian alumni
Academic staff of the Académie Julian